This is a non-exhaustive list of principal conductors by orchestra, classified by country and by city. The term 'principal conductor' is used here as an umbrella term to encompass such titles as:
 Principal conductor
 Music director
 Chief conductor
The term 'music director' is more common in the US and Canada, whereas 'principal conductor' or 'chief conductor' is more prevalent elsewhere.  For orchestras which have both a music director and a principal conductor, such as the Royal Northern Sinfonia and Orchestra Sinfonica di Milano Giuseppe Verdi, the person with the title of music director is given preference by hierarchy.

Orchestras which choose not to have principal conductors, such as the Orchestra of the Age of Enlightenment, Saint Paul Chamber Orchestra and the Vienna Philharmonic Orchestra, are omitted from this list.  Likewise, principal conductors for opera companies are omitted, unless the orchestra of that opera company performs orchestral concerts under a separate name.

Argentina

Armenia

Australia

Austria

Belgium

Bolivia

Brazil

Canada

Chile

China

Colombia

Czech Republic

Denmark

Finland

France

Germany

Hong Kong

Hungary

Iceland

Ireland

Israel

Italy

Japan

Latvia

Liechtenstein

Luxembourg

Macau

Malaysia

Netherlands

New Zealand

Norway

Paraguay

Philippines

Poland

Portugal

Russia

Singapore

Slovakia

Slovenia

South Korea

Spain

Sweden

Switzerland

Taiwan

United Kingdom

United States

Venezuela

Vietnam

References

Conductors (music)
Conductors
Conductors